Lernapat (also romanized as Lerrnapat; formerly, Makarashen and Gadzhikara) is a village in the Lori Province of Armenia. It is located around 5 kilometres north-west of the Vanadzor.

Demographics

Gallery

References

External links
 
 World Gazeteer: Armenia – World-Gazetteer.com

Populated places in Lori Province